Bryan Patrick Bracey (born August 5, 1978) is an American former basketball player. He played college basketball at the University of Wisconsin–Platteville, Malcolm X College, and the University of Oregon. In 2001, he finished second in the Pac-10 in points per game and was selected to the All-Pac-10 first team. He was drafted in the second round (57th pick overall, the last pick) of the 2001 NBA Draft by the San Antonio Spurs.

Early life and college
Bracey was born in Chicago and graduated from Oak Park High School at Oak Park, Illinois in 1996. Bracey also has Irish citizenship.  He played at University of Wisconsin–Platteville, under Bo Ryan, his first year after high school and contributed 4 points in the only game he saw the floor. He attended Malcolm X College, part of the City Colleges of Chicago, before transferring to the University of Oregon in 1999. In 2001, Bracey finished second in the Pac-10 with 18.6 points per game, led the Oregon Ducks with 7.1 rebounds per game, and was named to the All-Pac-10 first team. In January 2001, he was named Pac-10 Conference player of the week after averaging 25.5 points and 9 rebounds in two games.

Professional career
In the 2001 NBA Draft, the San Antonio Spurs selected Bracey as the 57th pick, the final overall pick. He never played a game for the Spurs or any other NBA team, making him 1 of 8 players from the 2001 NBA Draft to never play a game in the league.

Bracey debuted professionally with the Fayetteville Patriots of the NBA Development League but played only one game with that team. Bracey signed with Bnei Herzliya of Israeli Basketball Super League at the end of November 2001. He was credited for helping Herzliya rally from an 0–10 start in the season. Bracey left Israel in April 2002, during the Battle of Jenin.

Until being released in November 2002, Bracey played 10 games with the Italian team Air Avellino. He played until summer 2003 with Hapoel Jerusalem B.C. in Israel.

References

1978 births
Living people
AEL Limassol B.C. players
African-American basketball players
American expatriate basketball people in Belgium
American expatriate basketball people in Cyprus
American expatriate basketball people in France
American expatriate basketball people in Greece
American expatriate basketball people in Israel
American expatriate basketball people in Italy
American expatriate basketball people in Spain
American men's basketball players
American people of Irish descent
BC Dynamo Moscow players
Belfius Mons-Hainaut players
Basketball players from Chicago
Bnei Hertzeliya basketball players
Capitanes de Arecibo players
CB Murcia players
Élan Chalon players
Fayetteville Patriots players
Greek Basket League players
Hapoel Jerusalem B.C. players
Huntsville Flight players
Irish men's basketball players
Junior college men's basketball players in the United States
Liga ACB players
Oregon Ducks men's basketball players
Pagrati B.C. players
Peristeri B.C. players
S.S. Felice Scandone players
San Antonio Spurs draft picks
Scafati Basket players
Sportspeople from Oak Park, Illinois
Wisconsin–Platteville Pioneers men's basketball players
Forwards (basketball)
21st-century African-American sportspeople
20th-century African-American sportspeople
Criollos de Caguas basketball players